Ash, sometimes transliterated as aush or āsh, is a variety of thick noodle soups, which are usually served hot and is part of Iranian cuisine and Afghan cuisine. It is also found in  Azerbaijani, Turkish, Pakistani, and  Caucasian cuisine.

Etymology 
The spelling of the name of this dish varies in English and can include āsh, aush, ashe, ashe, āshe, aash, or osh. Aush means "thick soup" in Iranian languages.

The word "cook" translates to "Ashpaz" (آشپز) in Persian. The word is a combination of two Persian words of "aush" and "paz" and literally means "a person who cooks ash". Also the word "kitchen" in Persian is "Ashpazkhaneh" (آشپزخانه) literally meaning "house of cook" .

Ingredients
Ash is typically made with a variation of ingredients but may include flat wheat noodles, turmeric, vegetables (broccoli, carrots, onion, celery, spinach), legumes (chickpeas, kidney beans), herbs (dill, mint, coriander, minced cilantro), and optional meat such as ground lamb, beef or chicken. Depending on the type of aush, it could contain different types of grain, legumes (chick peas, black-eye beans, lentils), vegetables, tomato, herbs (parsley, spinach, dill, spring onion ends, coriander, dried mint), yogurt, onions, oil, meat, garlic, and spices, such as salt, pepper, turmeric, saffron, etc.

Ash can be considered a full meal or a first course. Aush can often be bought in Persian stores canned, as dried mixes or frozen.

Regional variation

Afghan cuisine
The Afghan soup is usually made with noodles and different vegetables in a tomato-based broth. The Afghan version of the soup is more likely to have tomatoes or a tomato broth. It is topped with chaka (yogurt sauce), fried garlic, and dried/crushed mint leaves.

Iranian cuisine
There are more than 50 types of thick soup (āsh) in Iranian cooking, ash reshteh being one of the more popular types; using reshteh. Some other well known āsh include ash-e anar (pomegranate stew), ash-e-jo (barley stew), ash-e doogh (yogurt stew), ash-e sak (spinach stew), ash-e torsh (beet/pickle stew), and aush-e-shalqham (turnips stew). The Iranian variation of aush often is topped with a garnish (na’na dagh) of fried mint oil, garlic chips, and/or shallot chips. In Jewish Iranian cuisine, aush is not typically served with dairy or yogurt.

See also

 Ash-e anar
 Ash reshteh
Chorba
 Kalehjoosh
 List of soups

References

Pashtun cuisine
Iranian soups
Afghan cuisine
Azerbaijani soups
Turkish soups
Caucasian cuisine
Pakistani cuisine